The 1991–92 Washington Capitals season was the Washington Capitals 18th season in the National Hockey League (NHL). They were not shut out in any of their regular-season games and playoff games.

Offseason

Regular season

The Capitals tied the Montreal Canadiens and the New York Rangers for fewest power-play goals allowed, with just 60.

Final standings

Schedule and results

Playoffs
Lost Division Semifinals vs. Pittsburgh Penguins, 3–4

Series results:
April 19–at Washington: Capitals, 3-1
April 21–at Washington:  Capitals, 6-2
April 23–at Pittsburgh:  Penguins, 6-4
April 25–at Pittsburgh:  Capitals, 7-2
April 27–at Washington:  Penguins, 5-2
April 29–at Pittsburgh:  Penguins, 6-4
May 1–at Washington:  Penguins, 3-1

Player statistics

Regular season
Scoring

Goaltending

Playoffs
Scoring

Goaltending

Note: GP = Games played; G = Goals; A = Assists; Pts = Points; +/- = Plus/minus; PIM = Penalty minutes; PPG=Power-play goals; SHG=Short-handed goals; GWG=Game-winning goals
      MIN=Minutes played; W = Wins; L = Losses; T = Ties; GA = Goals against; GAA = Goals against average; SO = Shutouts; SA=Shots against; SV=Shots saved; SV% = Save percentage;

Awards and records

Transactions

Draft picks
Washington's draft picks at the 1991 NHL Entry Draft held at the Buffalo Memorial Auditorium in Buffalo, New York.

Farm teams

See also
 1991–92 NHL season

References

External links
 

Wash
Wash
Washington Capitals seasons
Cap
Cap